Adolf Aldrich  (1916–2010) was an  American artist.

Biography
Aldrich was born in 1916 in Springfield, Massachusetts. In 1937 he produced the woodcut print Old Bridge for the Works Progress Administration. He contributed to a limited edition 1941 serigraph calendar along with fellow printmakers Philip Hicken, Edward Landon, Margaret Schadt, and Pauline Stiriss. During World War II Aldrich served as a Merchant Seaman.

Aldrich's work was included in 1944 Dallas Museum of Art exhibition of the National Serigraph Society. He was associated with the Atelier 17 printmaking studio in New York. He went on to pursue a career in graphic illustration and movie art direction, returning to painting in the 1990s.

Aldrich died on April 2, 2010 in Stroudsburg, Pennsylvania.

Aldrich's work is in the collection of the National Gallery of Art and the Library of Congress.

References

1916 births
2010 deaths
Artists from Springfield, Massachusetts
American male artists